The 2016–17 Brown Bears men's basketball team represented Brown University during the 2016–17 NCAA Division I men's basketball season. The Bears, led by fifth-year head coach Mike Martin, played their home games at the Pizzitola Sports Center and were members of the Ivy League. They finished the season 13–17, 4–10 in Ivy League play to finish in a three-way tie for last place. They failed to qualify for the inaugural Ivy League tournament.

Previous season 
The Bears finished the 2015–16 season 8–20, 3–11 in Ivy League play to finish in a tie for seventh place.

Offseason

Departures

2016 recruiting class

2017 recruiting class

Roster

Schedule and results

|-
!colspan=9 style=| Non-conference regular season

|-
!colspan=9 style=| Ivy League regular season

Source

References

Brown Bears men's basketball seasons
Brown
Brown
Brown